The B class are a class of diesel locomotives built by Clyde Engineering, Granville for the Victorian Railways in 1952–1953. Ordered and operated by the Victorian Railways, they initiated the dieselisation of the system and saw use on both passenger and freight services, with many remaining in service today, both in preserved and revenue service. Some were rebuilt as the V/Line A class, while others have been scrapped.

History

The B class were the first mainline diesel locomotives built for the Victorian Railways. The design was based on the successful Electro-Motive Diesel F-unit locomotives with the distinctive bulldog nose. They were unusual in having a streamlined drivers cab at each end.

Inception
After World War II, the Victorian Railways was run down from years of Depression-era under-investment and wartime over-utilisation. Chief Mechanical Engineer Ahlston traveled the world studying railway rehabilitation. Britain leaned towards steam locomotives, while France was moving towards main line electrification. The United States was more divided, with General Motors' Electro-Motive Division at La Grange, Illinois turning out modern E and F-units diesels. However the EMD units axle load was too heavy for the Victorian tracks, and the Commonwealth Government would not allow the use of foreign currency to purchase United States diesels. As a result, the £80 million Operation Phoenix featured steam locomotives and electrification of the Gippsland line, either locally built or imported from the United Kingdom.

To achieve a lighter axle load, a six axles / six motor Co-Co wheel arrangement was required. By 1949, the head of Electro-Motive Diesel Dick Dilworth was convinced that lighter axle load locomotives would be popular in Australia and other foreign countries. Frank Shea of Clyde Engineering had also negotiated with EMD to build the new locomotive locally, in order to overcome the foreign exchange restrictions. The order was placed in 1951 and the first locomotive was delivered on 14 July 1952.

Into service
The 26 members of the class operated on broad gauge lines throughout Victoria, working the majority of the important passenger trains, as well as fast freights. Many timetables were accelerated, and steam locomotives began to be scrapped in large numbers. The visit of Queen Elizabeth in 1954 saw her ride behind B60 on a special train.

While costing £80 per horsepower compared to £60 for steam, the new locomotives ran 130,000 miles per year, compared to 35,000 and 60,000 miles per year for main line steam locomotives. The Chief Engineers Office found that one B class did the work of three steam locomotives. Their success led to further dieselisation, with the delivery of the T class branch line units from 1955, and the single ended S class mainline units from 1957.

Demise, reactivation and preservation
As part of the 1980s New Deal plan to reinvigorate country passenger services, it was decided to rebuild the B class with new traction equipment as the A class. The rebuild contract was let in January 1983 to Clyde Engineering, Rosewater, with the first unit entering service in May 1984. The project was abandoned in mid 1985 after rising costs due to structural fatigue, with the eleventh and final rebuild delivered in August 1985.

At the same time newer high power locomotives had been delivered, including the N class passenger units and the more numerous G class freight locomotives. The B class gradually retired by V/Line from 1982 with some scrapped. Six were purchased by West Coast Railway in the early 1990s for use on their Melbourne to Warrnambool passenger service. While running with West Coast Railway, units B61 and B76 had dual marker lights and ditch lights fitted at the No.1 end. They also received shunter's steps at each end, in late 2001 or early 2002. B65 was painted in the simplified West Coast Railway "freight" livery, and did not receive any of these upgrades.

In May 2004, the Victorian Department of Infrastructure issued an alert on stress cracks on the underframes of the B class locomotives, including the units owned by West Coast Railway. Following West Coast Railway's demise in August 2004, these were sold to Chicago Freight Car Leasing Australia and refurbished with some being resold to Southern Shorthaul Railroad. This saw some converted to standard gauge and their sphere of operation increased to include New South Wales. Seymour Railway Heritage Centre have B74 preserved in operating condition and is the only preserved locomotive in operation.

Fleet summary

Models

N Scale

Gopher Models have released N Scale Models of the B Class Locomotives, featuring B60 & B61.

OO Gauge

Tri-ang manufactured an OO gauge version of the B Class in the 1960s, albeit with four-wheeled bogies. This model is not compatible with modern OO gauge/HO scale track (such as code 100), as the flanges are designed for early Tri-Ang rails, which are roughly twice the size of modern rails.

HO Scale

The first HO scale B Class models were manufactured by Lima in the 1970s through to the 1990s. One such example is B80 in V/Line orange and grey livery. These models have European hook-and-loop couplers integrated into the bogies and a transverse pancake motor driving one bogie, similar in design to the Hornby Ringfield motor. As the bogies and couplers are one piece, the pilot is also attached to the bogie rather than the body.

As of October 2009, only HO scale plastic models of the B Class are available produced by Auscision Models. Some are being rerun in 2020 with the option of having DCC with sound already fitted with new liveries being added that weren't in the original run.

2020 Rerun as follows: B60 "Sir Harold W. Clapp" (VR Original), B62 (VR Original with 1 Million Miles Plate), B84 (V/Line All Orange), B80 (Murraylander), B61 (SSR), B65 (Auscision Models), B60 "Sir Harold W. Clapp" (VR Modified), B71 (VR Original), B78 (VR Original), B63 (VR Modified), B70 (VR Modified), B74 (VR As Preserved), B64 (VicRail Teacup), B69 (V/Line Orange and Grey), B83 (V/Line Orange and Grey), B76 (West Coast Rail), B65 (West Coast Rail Austeriety), B61 (Streamliners 2016), B80 (Chicago Freight Car Leasing Australia with Metro Trains Stickers) and B75 (Consolidate Rail Leasing).

2009 Original Run as follows: B60 "Sir Harold W. Clapp" (VR Original), B62 (VR Original with 1 Million Miles Plate), B74 (VR Original), B85 (VR Original), B67 (VR Modified), B72 (VR Modified), B75 (VR Modified), B68 (VicRail Teacup), B83 (VicRail Teacup), B84 (V/Line All Orange), B63 (V/Line Orange and Grey), B74 (V/Line Orange and Grey), B82 (V/Line Orange and Grey), B61 (West Coast Rail), B80 (Murraylander), B61 (SSR), B76 (Chicago Freight Car Leasing Australia), B65 (Auscision Models) (was a Limited Edition of 300 units) and B60 "Sir Harlod W. Clapp" (VR Modified).

Gallery

References

Further reading

Clyde Engineering locomotives
Co-Co locomotives
Railway locomotives introduced in 1952
B class
Broad gauge locomotives in Australia
Standard gauge locomotives of Australia
Diesel-electric locomotives of Australia
Streamlined diesel locomotives